Triangle of Sadness is a 2022 satirical black comedy film written and directed by Ruben Östlund in his English-language feature film debut. The film stars Harris Dickinson, Charlbi Dean, Dolly de Leon, Zlatko Burić, Henrik Dorsin, Vicki Berlin, and Woody Harrelson. The film follows a celebrity couple on a luxury cruise with wealthy guests.

Triangle of Sadness had its world premiere at the 2022 Cannes Film Festival on 21 May 2022, where it received an eight-minute standing ovation and won the Palme d'Or, and was released in France on 28 September, in the United States and Sweden on 7 October, in Germany on 13 October, and in the United Kingdom on 28 October. The film received generally positive reviews, while De Leon's performance received international praise, garnering her first Golden Globe and BAFTA nominations for her supporting role. It also won four European Film Awards, including the Best Film award, and received three nominations at the 95th Academy Awards: Best Picture, Best Director and Best Original Screenplay.

Plot

Part 1: Carl & Yaya 
Carl, a model, attends an uncomfortable casting call with other male models. Carl is dating Yaya, a model and influencer, and resents her for expecting him to pay for meals even though she earns more than he does. They bicker about money and gender roles. Yaya admits that she is in a relationship with Carl for the engagement it earns them on social media, and that she seeks to become a trophy wife, but Carl declares that she will come to love him.

Part 2: The Yacht 
Carl and Yaya are invited on a luxury cruise aboard a superyacht in exchange for its social media promotion. Among the wealthy guests are the Russian oligarch Dimitry and his wife Vera; the elderly couple Clementine and Winston, who have made their fortune manufacturing weapons; Therese, a wheelchair user only capable of speaking a single sentence in German following a stroke; and Jarmo, a lonely tech millionaire who flirts with Yaya. The guests luxuriate on the yacht, oblivious to the crew working to meet their every need and whim. The head of staff, Paula, demands they obey the guests' absurd requests, including having every crew member swim in the sea. The kitchen crew is ordered to swim as well, despite the chef warning that the food will go bad. Carl complains to Paula about a crew member whom Yaya finds attractive, inadvertently getting the man fired. Meanwhile, the yacht's captain, Thomas Smith, spends his time drunk in his cabin.

Paula gets Thomas to sober up and attend the captain's dinner as the yacht passes through a storm. Several guests become violently seasick, vomit or have diarrhea, possibly due to the food, and panic breaks out. The drunken Thomas and Dimitry debate in favor of communism and capitalism, respectively, over the intercom. Several guests are injured as the storm tosses the ship, the sewage floods, and the power goes out. When morning arrives, pirates attack, killing Clementine and Winston with a grenade and capsizing the yacht.

Part 3: The Island 
A small group of survivors consisting of Carl, Yaya, Dimitry, Therese, Paula, Jarmo, ship mechanic Nelson (whom Dimitry accuses of being a pirate), and cleaning woman Abigail manage to escape to an island. At first, Paula continues to order Abigail to service the cruise guests. When it becomes clear that Abigail is the only one with survival skills, such as catching fish and building fires, she usurps command by withholding food. As the survivors bond and come to terms with their situation, Abigail gains power, getting her own private bed inside a lifeboat and coercing Carl into a sexual relationship by giving him special privileges and food. Yaya grows jealous while Carl considers leaving her for Abigail. Jarmo kills a wild donkey by smashing it with a rock, which Dimitry and Nelson celebrate.

Yaya decides to hike to the other side of the island, and Abigail volunteers to go with her despite Carl's concerns. They discover a beachside elevator and realize they have been stranded near a luxury resort. Back at the camp, Therese encounters a beach vendor but is unable to communicate her situation. Yaya celebrates finding the elevator, but Abigail hesitates to enter. She then prepares to attack Yaya with a rock, but hesitates when the oblivious Yaya offers to help Abigail get better work, such as being Yaya's assistant. Elsewhere, Carl frantically runs through the jungle, following Yaya and Abigail towards the beach.

Cast 
 Harris Dickinson as Carl
 Charlbi Dean as Yaya
 Dolly de Leon as Abigail
 Zlatko Burić as Dimitry
 Iris Berben as Therese
 Vicki Berlin as Paula
 Henrik Dorsin as Jarmo
 Jean-Christophe Folly as Nelson
 Amanda Walker as Clementine
 Oliver Ford Davies as Winston
 Sunnyi Melles as Vera
 Woody Harrelson as Captain Thomas Smith

Production 
Triangle of Sadness was announced by the director, Ruben Östlund, in June 2017, after his film The Square won the Palme d'Or at the 70th Cannes Film Festival the previous month. He said the film was to be called Triangle of Sadness, a "wild" satire set against the world of fashion and the uber-rich, with "appearance as capital" and "beauty as currency" as the underlying themes. The English title refers to a term used by plastic surgeons for the worry wrinkle that forms between the eyebrows, which can be removed with botox.

Research for some parts of the script took place in May 2018. Casting took place from August to November 2018 in Berlin, Paris, London, New York, Los Angeles and Gothenburg, and continued in Moscow in March 2019. Location scouting began in January 2019 and lasted intermittently until October 2019. Östlund fine-tuned the last details of pre-production from November 2019 to the first half of February 2020.

In February 2020, it was reported that Triangle of Sadness would begin principal photography on 19 February in Sweden and Greece, with a 70-day shoot, and that the cast would include Harris Dickinson, Charlbi Dean and Woody Harrelson. About 120 actors were considered for the role that Dickinson landed. On 26 March, production paused due to the COVID-19 pandemic with about 37% of shooting completed. Editing started during the first COVID-19 lockdown in 2020. Production resumed on 27 June in Sweden, allowing Harrelson to finish his scenes, but was halted again on 3 July.

Production resumed on 18 September on location at Chiliadou Beach, Euboea, Greece, for the last 38 days. Photography wrapped on 13 November 2020, concluding a 73-day shoot. Östlund reported that the production carried out 1,061 COVID-19 tests throughout filming and all were negative. Filming also took place on other Greek islands, on the stages of Film i Väst in Trollhättan, Sweden, and in the Mediterranean Sea on the Christina O, the yacht formerly owned by Aristotle Onassis and Jackie Kennedy. Post-production lasted 22 months. According to the actors, Östlund shot as many as 23 takes for each scene.

Release 
Triangle of Sadness premiered at the Cannes Film Festival on 21 May 2022, and on 28 May won the festival's Palme d'Or. It was an official selection of the 2022 Toronto International Film Festival, where it held its North American premiere on 8 September, and the 2022 New York Film Festival (1 October).

Neon acquired North American distribution rights for $8 million, winning a bidding war with A24, Searchlight Pictures/Hulu, Focus Features and Sony Pictures Classics. The film was released in France on 28 September 2022, in the United States and Sweden on 7 October, in Germany on 13 October, and in the United Kingdom on 28 October.

On VOD, it ranked #2 on iTunes Movies following the Oscar nomination announcements.

A 4K UHD, Blu-ray and DVD disc is set to be released by The Criterion Collection by April 25, 2023.

Reception

Box office 
, Triangle of Sadness has grossed $4.6 million in the United States and Canada, and $20.5 million in other territories, for a total worldwide gross of $25.1 million.

In the United States, Triangle of Sadness opened in 10 locations in Los Angeles, New York and San Francisco to a debut of $210,074, for a per theater average of $21,007. In its second weekend, it grossed $657,051 on 31 screens. In its third weekend, it grossed $600,000 on 280 screens, finishing tenth at the box office. In its fourth weekend, it grossed $548,999 on 610 screens, dropping out of the box office top ten.

Critical response 
On the review aggregator website Rotten Tomatoes, the film holds an approval rating of 72% based on 262 reviews, with an average rating of 7.2/10. The site's critical consensus reads, "Triangle of Sadness lacks the sharp edges of Östlund's earlier work, but this blackly humorous swipe at the obscenely affluent has its own rewards." On Metacritic, the film has a weighted average score of 63 out of 100, based on 47 critics, indicating "generally favorable reviews".

Alysha Prasad of One Room With A View called it "Utterly unhinged in the best way possible, guaranteed to elicit enough laughter to make your stomach ache, while also leaving you with plenty to think about afterwards." David Kaplan of Kaplan vs. Kaplan praised the ensemble cast as "completely compelling, even if some of the characters are unsavory." Aaron Neuwirth of We Live Entertainment described it as containing "what’s likely the grossest set piece I’ve seen in a movie awarded the Palme d’Or at the Cannes Film Festival." Gabi Zeitsman of Channel 24 (South Africa) commented, "if you loved White Lotus and satire aimed at the beautiful and rich, this is a definite must-watch. The fact that it won the Palme d'Or is in itself almost satirical..." "Don't go in expecting art-house intellectualism," wrote Kyle Smith (critic) of the Wall Street Journal, "The movie is as loaded with fun as it is with social implications." Paul Byrnes of the Sydney Morning Herald commented, "For Östlund, subtlety is overrated. Triangle of Sadness shows us why he has a point. It’s a spectacular demolition of modern life, a disruptor movie full of ideas and nuance, as violent in its way as a Pieter Bruegel painting." Kevin Maher (writer) of The Times detected more nuance in the film, however, stating: "Yes, the metaphor can seem very on-the-nose: the super rich, in this economic climate especially, are obscene and repulsive! But it's a film of great subtlety (really) and benefits from multiple viewings."

Richard Brody, in a critical review for The New Yorker, described Triangle of Sadness as "a movie of targeted demagogy that pitches its facile political stances to the preconceptions of the art-house audience; far from deepening those ideas or challenging those assumptions, it flatters the like-minded viewership while swaggering with the filmmaker’s presumption of freethinking, subversive audacity." Brody described Östlund's direction as "precise but stiff" and criticised the film's emphasis on social commentary: "[Östlund's] keen observations are submerged in his efforts at social criticism and political philosophy." However, Brody commended the cast performances—particularly Dean's, of which he wrote: "If nothing else, the movie would have assured her stardom; there’s no telling how many characters and films her death foreclosed before their conception."

Armond White, in a critical review for National Review, talks about the substitution of concepts in Triangle of Sadness: "Östlund extends his Euro-Marxism into a second-rate allegory about third-world exploitation: An insulting subplot features the ship's Filipino toilet manager (Dolly De Leon) turning the tables on the rich, feckless whites, yet emulating their decadence (Parasite, Part II). Östlund bungles the political, spiritual, and moral lessons of such classics about chaos as Luis Buñuel's Exterminating Angel, Antonioni's L'Avventura, and Godard's Weekend." White sums up his review calling Östlund "just a misanthrope and a fraud."

Accolades

References

External links 
 Triangle of Sadness at Festival de Cannes
 Triangle of Sadness at TIFF
 Triangle of Sadness at NYFF
 
 
 Official screenplay

2022 films
2022 black comedy films
2020s British films
2020s English-language films
2020s French films
2020s German films
2020s Mexican films
2020s American films
2020s satirical films
2020s Swedish films
Arte France Cinéma films
BBC Film films
British black comedy films
British satirical films
Film productions suspended due to the COVID-19 pandemic
Films about the upper class
Films about social media
Films directed by Ruben Östlund
Films set on cruise ships
Films set on islands
Films shot in Greece
Films shot in Sweden
French black comedy films
French satirical films
German black comedy films
German satirical films
Palme d'Or winners
Swedish black comedy films
Swedish satirical films
Films about survivors of seafaring accidents or incidents